Out There was a concert tour by English singer-songwriter Paul McCartney lasting from 4 May 2013 to 22 October 2015.  Some notable nights of the tour included concerts at Warsaw's National Stadium, Verona's Roman Amphitheatre, and Vienna's Happel Stadium, the latter of which he would play for the first time since 2003's Back in the World tour. McCartney played in Belo Horizonte, Cariacica, Goiânia and Fortaleza, all in Brazil (his first time playing in all four cities) and in Japan for the first time since the Driving World Tour back in 2002.

The setlist for Out There included songs by McCartney's former bands the Beatles and Wings, along with songs from his solo career. Following the release of McCartney's solo album New in October 2013, the songs "New" and "Queenie Eye" were added to the setlist.

Background 
The first official show announced for this tour was a show in Warsaw, Poland. In this announcement, a statement stated that the "Out There! Tour" will "see McCartney and his band travel the world throughout the year, even visiting some places they've never been before." At the press conference for the Brazilian shows, the manager of the Brazilian leg explained that the "Out There! Tour" will feature a new lighting rig, a platform to carry McCartney into the audience, and new songs into McCartney's live repertoire. The tour's announcement was taken at an unusual pace. Rather than announcing the full tour in bulk, each show was announced individually at different dates and times. This gave each venue an opportunity to be exposed in the spotlight. The production was teased in rehearsal photos leaked online, and later released on McCartney's website before the first show in Brazil. These photos displayed elements of the production including a scissor-lift platform that carried McCartney six metres (20 feet) into the air, and the use of laser lights. The first show revealed new video graphics and a stage floor consisting of illuminated LED panels.

In South America 

After much success in Latin America during the Up and Coming and On the Run tours, a petition was started in the town of Belo Horizonte for McCartney to perform in the city. An announcement from PaulMcCartney.com listed three Brazilian shows to begin his 2013 tour. The tour started on 4 May 2013 in Belo Horizonte, Brazil and continued to Goiânia and Fortaleza. This marked his first time performing in all three cities. McCartney was greeted on arrival with billboards across the town of Belo Horizonte welcoming him to the city. Fans were camped outside of the stadium for days to earn a good spot for his show.

On the first night of the tour, McCartney played several Beatles songs live for the first time: "Eight Days a Week", "Your Mother Should Know", "All Together Now", "Being for the Benefit of Mr. Kite!" and "Lovely Rita". This show was performed to a sold-out crowd of 55,000 fans. As a sign of appreciation during "Hey Jude", fans held up signs that read "Thank You" to McCartney after responding to their petition.

At the next show in Goiânia, the stage was swarmed with grasshoppers. The Esperanca Grilo, which translates to the Hope Grasshopper, swarmed the stage, equipment, and even the band and crew during the show. McCartney made notation of the grasshoppers during "Hey Jude", as he sang the line "The movement you need is on your shoulder", turning to his shoulder, singing to the grasshoppers.

Nearly four months after the last show in Japan, McCartney decided to extend the tour during 2014, by announcing a new South American leg, which started in Montevideo, Uruguay, travelling then to Santiago, Chile, to continue after with a show in Lima, Peru, and another in Quito, Ecuador, this being McCartney's first ever show in the country.

In Europe 
The announcement of the first show of the tour came on 20 March 2013. With the headline "Paul McCartney Is Getting 'Out There!'" a performance was listed for Warsaw, Poland at the Stadion Narodowy. This performance on 22 June 2013 marked McCartney's first ever performance in the country of Poland. In the hours following this announcement, a second European show for Vienna, Austria was listed for 27 June 2013. This concert at the Ernst Happel Stadion was his fourth ever concert in Vienna and his first since 2003 during the Back in the World tour. A third European show for 2013 was announced on 26 March 2013, to take place at the Arena di Verona in Verona, Italy for his first Verona performance.

In North America 
Within the announcements of the extension of the tour during 2014, on 13 March, McCartney announced his first ever concert in Costa Rica.

McCartney's first live information for 2013 was announced on 19 February 2013. In a special webcast announcing the 2013 Bonnaroo Music and Arts Festival, McCartney was confirmed as a headliner of the festival in Manchester, Tennessee. McCartney's specific date and set time was announced 1 May 2013. McCartney took the stage for this performance on 14 June 2013, with a two and a half hour set. Following the announcements of shows in Europe and South America, and Bonnaroo, a show for Boston's Fenway Park was announced for 9 July 2013. This was his first show at Fenway Park since two performances there in 2009.  Following the Boston date were shows in Austin, Texas at the Frank Erwin Center for McCartney's Austin debut, Washington, D.C. for his first performance at Nationals Park, a return to the BOK Center in Tulsa, Oklahoma. Shortly after the previous announcements came the confirmation of his first performances in Memphis, Tennessee and Orlando, Florida since his 1993 New World Tour, at the FedExForum and Amway Center respectively. A performance for Seattle's Safeco Field was added to the tour, marking the first major performance at the park.

McCartney also played at Bankers Life Fieldhouse in Indianapolis on 14 July 2013. Due to popular demand, a second show was booked for Orlando, Austin, and Tulsa. A much rumoured show at Miller Park in Milwaukee was confirmed on 15 April 2013. This performance of 16 July was his first show in Milwaukee since 2005, and his first concert at Miller Park. In a video released on 16 April 2013 by the Outside Lands Music and Arts Festival, McCartney was named as a headliner of the festival. It was later announced on 24 June that McCartney would headline on Friday, 9 August 2013. This will be his first performance in California since his 2010 performance at AT&T Park in San Francisco.

On 18 April 2013, it was announced that McCartney would take the stage for the first time at the Barclays Center in New York City on 8 and 10 June for a return to New York since his highly successful Yankee Stadium shows in 2011 and the 12-12-12: The Concert for Sandy Relief appearance. With mostly American dates announced, in mid April, McCartney announced his first Canadian dates of 2013. Shows at the Investors Group Field in Winnipeg, Mosaic Stadium at Taylor Field in Regina, and the Scotiabank Place (to be renamed "Canadian Tire Centre" days prior to the show) in Ottawa were all announced on 22 April 2013, just hours apart from each other. This is to be McCartney's first performances in Ottawa and Regina, and a return to Winnipeg since 1993. On 25 April 2013, McCartney announced a return to the Plains of Abraham in Quebec City from his concert celebrating the city's 400th anniversary. The show was played on 23 July 2013.

Many shows on the tour had anomalies from the average stage show, making them highlights. The first show in Orlando featured "Hope of Deliverance" in the set which was played in the prior Brazil leg of the tour. This was the only time the song was performed in North America this year as it was usually replaced by either "I've Just Seen a Face" or "Things We Said Today" for the remainder of the tour. The second night in Orlando saw the tour debut of "I Saw Her Standing There" in place of "Get Back". These two songs would usually alternate between shows. At Bonnaroo, which was the largest attendance crowd on the tour, McCartney performed "Midnight Special" because of lyrics referring to nearby Nashville. The show in Ottawa brought the tour debuts of the songs "Michelle" and "Mull of Kintyre" to the setlist. "Mull of Kintyre" was performed with the full Ottawa Police Service Pipe Band. In Seattle, McCartney brought onstage the remaining members of Nirvana –  Dave Grohl, Krist Novoselic, plus their touring musician Pat Smear – to perform their collaborative effort "Cut Me Some Slack" from Grohl's movie Sound City. The three continued onstage with McCartney and the band to finish the encore, which included the first performance of "Long Tall Sally" since 1986. "Birthday" was performed for the first time on the tour at the Plains of Abraham show, which also featured "Michelle". At Outside Lands, McCartney replaced "All My Loving" with "Magical Mystery Tour" early in the show. He also performed "San Francisco Bay Blues" and dedicated that song to both "Shelly" and the city of San Francisco. During the encore, McCartney brought the Kronos Quartet, who had already performed with The National earlier in the day, onstage with him and Wickens to perform "Yesterday". "Mull of Kintyre" at the next show in Winnipeg was performed with the City of Winnipeg Police Pipe Band. In Regina, SK, the City of Regina Pipe Band joined McCartney for this number.

McCartney entered 2014 with more access to his fans via the social media app Instagram. After already having used this app to announce and promote shows in Asia and Latin America, McCartney used the app as one of his main ways of announcing shows. He would often post when a series of dates were announced, putting a hashtag (#) with each city he would play. The first announcement appeared on Instagram as well as several other social media outlets on 8 April. The cities were New Orleans, Louisville, Albany, and Pittsburgh at the Smoothie King Center, Yum! Center, Times Union Center, and the Consol Energy Center respectively. McCartney visited Louisville and Albany for the first time, and returning to New Orleans for the first time since 2002, and Pittsburgh since 2010. Another announcement came on 16 April which reported McCartney's first show in Lubbock at the United Supermarkets Arena in homage to his boyhood idol Buddy Holly, his return to Dallas and Atlanta since 2009 at the American Airlines Center and the Philips Arena respectively, his first full headlining show in Jacksonville at the Jacksonville Veterans Memorial Arena having only played during the Super Bowl XXXIX halftime in 2005 and the Beatles only Floridian concert in 1964, and McCartney's return to the Bridgestone Arena in Nashville, and the EnergySolutions Arena in Salt Lake City from his visits during his 2010 Up and Coming Tour. Midwestern United States shows were announced on 21 April at the United Center in Chicago after a couple of shows at the historic Wrigley Field in 2011, McCartney's first appearance in Fargo and Lincoln at the Fargodome and Pinnacle Bank Arena respectively, a return to the Sprint Center in Kansas City from 2010, and a concert at Target Field in Minneapolis for McCartney's first Twin Cities show since 2005. This was followed by his first-ever appearance in Missoula, Montana, announced on 28 April along with a concert date in Phoenix, where he had previously performed in 2010.  A historic return and final concert for McCartney at Candlestick Park in San Francisco was announced on 24 April after months of rumours and even a pledge from the mayor of San Francisco himself. McCartney performed in San Francisco last exactly a year and a day prior to the Candlestick Park date, at the Outside Lands Music and Arts Festival in 2013. This is a notable venue seeing as it held the final official Beatles concert in history. An announcement for a show at Dodger Stadium in Los Angeles came a day later. This will be another historic concert as the Beatles played their second to final official concert at the stadium in 1966, the day before the Candlestick Park farewell. It will be the first McCartney event in Southern California since the duo of shows at the Hollywood Bowl in Los Angeles during the 2010 Up and Coming tour. After the cancellation of the entire 2014 Asian leg of the tour, McCartney later postponed all June 2014 shows to October of that year.

On 25 February 2015, PaulMcCartney.com confirmed the rumours that McCartney would headline the Firefly Music Festival on Friday 19 June 2015.

McCartney announced his first non-festival US date for 2015 on 24 April. The show was performed at the Wells Fargo Center in Philadelphia on 21 June. This was his first trip to Philadelphia since his Up and Coming Tour on 14 and 15 August 2010. On 28 April 2015 South Carolina governor Nikki Haley announced that McCartney was coming to Columbia, South Carolina. On 25 June 2015 during his stop in Columbia, South Carolina, McCartney dedicated "The Long and Winding Road" to the ones who died in the Charleston, South Carolina church shooting.

The tour itself concluded in October 2015 after a series of five shows in the Great Lakes region of the United States and Canada.

In Asia 
Almost exactly 11 years to the day since McCartney last embarked on a run of shows in Japan during the Driving World Tour, November 2013 saw him bring his Out There! Tour to Japan to play six shows in Osaka, Fukuoka and Tokyo. The news was announced on 16 July 2013 on his official website. The first date will take place in Osaka on 11 November and the tour will continue on the Fukuoka Dome on 15 November. A run of shows at the Tokyo Dome followed, taking place on 18, 19, 21 November. On 26 March 2014, McCartney announced three new shows in Japan, playing this time in stadiums on the same cities, adding later his first show ever in South Korea, but when arriving to Japan, he came down with a virus that forced him to postpone, and then cancel all the Asian leg shows.

In 2015, the cancelled Asian leg shows were rescheduled. The first show was held in Osaka on 21 April 2015. At the Tokyo Dome, there were three shows on 23, 25, 27 April. On 28 April, the show continued on the Budokan, where the Beatles held their concert in 1966.

On 28 April 2015 at the Nippon Budokan, Tokyo, Japan, McCartney performed live "Another Girl" (the fifth song from the Beatles' Help! album) for the first time ever by a Beatle. At the same show, he performed live the song "Dance Tonight" for the first time since 2012.

On 2 May 2015 at the Seoul Olympic Stadium, South Korea, accompanying himself with his Hofner bass guitar, McCartney played and sang with the audience a reprise of "Hey Jude" for the first time ever.

Tour dates

Notes

Set list

Average set list

 "Eight Days a Week" or "Magical Mystery Tour"
 "Save Us"++ or "Junior's Farm"+
 "All My Loving" or "Another Girl"+++ or "Can't Buy Me Love"+++ or "Got to Get You Into My Life"+++
 "Listen to What the Man Said" or "Good Day Sunshine"+++ or "Jet" or "One After 909"
 "Temporary Secretary"+++
 "Let Me Roll It"
 "Paperback Writer"
 "My Valentine"
 "Nineteen Hundred and Eighty-Five"
 "The Long and Winding Road"
 "Maybe I'm Amazed"
 "I've Just Seen a Face" or "I'm Looking Through You"+++ or "Things We Said Today" or "Hope of Deliverance"
 "We Can Work It Out"
 "Another Day"
 "Hope for the Future"+++
 "And I Love Her"
 "Blackbird"
 "Here Today"
 "New"++ or "Your Mother Should Know"+ 
 "Queenie Eye"++
 "Lady Madonna"
 "All Together Now"
 "Lovely Rita"
 "Everybody Out There"++ (not played in all cities) or "Mrs. Vandebilt"+
 "Eleanor Rigby"
 "Being for the Benefit of Mr. Kite!"
 "Something"
 "Ob-La-Di, Ob-La-Da"
 "Band on the Run"
 "Back in the U.S.S.R."
 "Let It Be"
 "Live and Let Die"
 "Hey Jude"
Encore 1
 "Day Tripper" or "Another Girl"+++
 "Hi, Hi, Hi" or "Birthday"
 "Get Back" or "I Saw Her Standing There" or "Can't Buy Me Love"+++
Encore 2
 "Yesterday"
 "Helter Skelter"
 "Golden Slumbers"/"Carry That Weight"/"The End"

+ Performed before the release of New
++ Performed since the release of New
+++ Performed in 2015

Other set lists

See also 
 List of Paul McCartney concert tours
 List of highest-grossing concert tours

References 

2013 concert tours
2014 concert tours
2015 concert tours
Paul McCartney concert tours